Carl Joel Samuel Rajalakso (born 2 April 1993 in Enköping) is a Swedish footballer who played for Carlstad United as a midfielder. He's the younger brother of Sebastian Rajalakso. He left Carlstad United in December 2018.

References

External links

1993 births
Living people
Åtvidabergs FF players
Swedish footballers
Sweden youth international footballers
Allsvenskan players
Ettan Fotboll players
Östers IF players
IFK Luleå players
Association football midfielders
People from Enköping
Sportspeople from Uppsala County